The Leon Trionfante-class were a class of at least fourteen 70-gun third rate ships of the line built by the Venetian Arsenale from 1716 to 1785, in four different series with minor changes in the ships' length. In 1797, when Venice fell to the French, Napoleon captured several ships of the class, still unfinished in the Arsenal: he chose one of them, forced the shipbuilders to have it completed and added it to his fleet en route for Egypt. After Campoformio, the remaining vessels were destroyed by the French to avoid their capture by the Austrian Empire.

Design and history
Almost all the ships of this class were planned and started before 1739, completed to a 70%, then stored in the roofed shipbuilding docks of the Arsenale to be finished and launched when the Venetian Navy need them, a solution the British Royal Navy adopted only in 1810, when the docks at Chatham were covered.

This decision, mostly due to the chronic lack of funds of the Republic of Venice in its final years, led to retain in service older and inferior ships than the ones built at the same time for the British Royal Navy and the French Royal Navy. Moreover, contemporary third rates had heavier guns (32-pounders on the gun deck and 18-pounders on the upper gun deck), even if the armament of those ships could be brought up to 72-74 guns. Except for the Leon Trionfante and the Diligenza, none of this class' ships remained in service for more than fifteen years.

Ships

Buon Consiglio
Ordered: 1719
Launched: 1761
Fate: Broken up, 1776

Fedeltà
Ordered: 1719
Launched: 1769
Fate: Broken up, 1783

Forza
Ordered: 1719
Launched: 1774
Fate: Wrecked, 1784

Corriera Veneta
Ordered: 1722
Launched: 1770
Fate: Wrecked, 1771

Diligenza
Ordered: 1724
Launched: 1774
Fate: Broken up, 1797

Fenice
Ordered: 1723
Launched: 1779
Fate: Sunk, 1786

Galatea
Ordered: 1722
Launched: 1779
Fate: Broken up, 1793

Vittoria
Ordered: 1732
Launched: 1784
Fate: Broken up, 1797

La Guerriera
Ordered: 1732
Launched: 1785
Fate: Burnt, 1785

Medea
Ordered: 1732
Launched: 1793
Fate: Captured, 1797

Eolo
Ordered: 1739
Launched: 1782
Fate: Captured, 1797

San Giorgio
Ordered: 1736
Launched: 1785
Fate: Captured, 1797

See also
 Venetian Navy
 Arsenal of Venice
 List of sailing ships in Venetian Navy
 Venetian bombardments of the Beylik of Tunis (1784–88)

References

Notes

Citations

Websites

Books

Ships of the line of the Venetian navy
Ship of the line classes
Ships built by the Venetian Arsenal
18th century in the Republic of Venice